The Stone Mountain Airport , later also known as Stone Mountain Britt Memorial Airport (after the owner's wife), was a small privately run public-use airport located in Stone Mountain, Georgia (east-northeast of the mountain) from around 1962 until 1996. The fixed-base operator was Stone Mountain Aviation Inc.

It was closed prior to the Centennial 1996 Summer Olympics in nearby Atlanta.  By the 2000s, the hangars and other buildings had been removed, It is now used for R/C plane hobbyists.  Its FAA location ID is now used at an R/C heliport in Bensalem, Pennsylvania.

External links
http://www.airfields-freeman.com/GA/Airfields_GA_Atlanta.htm#stonemtn

Buildings and structures in DeKalb County, Georgia
1963 establishments in Georgia (U.S. state)
1996 disestablishments in Georgia (U.S. state)
Defunct airports in Georgia (U.S. state)
Airports established in 1963
Airports disestablished in 1996